Takai Makisi (born circa 1962) is a Tongan former rugby union player. He played as prop.

Career
Makisi debuted for Tonga against New Zealand Maori in Rotorua, on 6 August 1983. He was part of the 1987 Rugby World Cup Tongan squad, but did not play any match in the tournament. His last cap was against Fiji, in Nuku'alofa, on 22 July 1989.

References

External links

1962 births
Living people
Tongan rugby union players
Rugby union props
Tonga international rugby union players